Hastings West was an electoral riding in Ontario, Canada. It was created in 1867 at the time of confederation. It was abolished in 1966 before the 1967 election.

Members of Provincial Parliament

References

Former provincial electoral districts of Ontario